Oxbridge is a hamlet in the English county of Dorset. It lies on the River Brit between Bridport and Beaminster.

External links 

Hamlets in Dorset